Carolyn Hopkins is an American public service announcer. Her recorded voice announcements are heard in major transportation systems around the world.

Career
Hopkins's recorded unattended baggage announcements range from service status updates to safety tips. Her voice can be heard in more than 200 airports over the world, including Pittsburgh International Airport, LaGuardia Airport, John F. Kennedy International Airport, Incheon International Airport, Dallas/Fort Worth International Airport, Paris-Charles de Gaulle Airport, Mérida International Airport, and Denver International Airport. She has also recorded for such public transit systems as the New York City Subway, the Staten Island Ferry, Grand Central Terminal, and the Paris Métro.

Originally from Louisville, Kentucky, Hopkins now lives in Maine. Her first voice recording was for RCA in Indianapolis, while her first airport service announcement was for O’Hare International Airport.

When co-founder Hardy Martin and three other partners started IED (Innovative Electronic Designs), they chose Hopkins as one of their first voices. It was for the Typhoon Lagoon attraction at Disney World in Florida in 1989.

Hopkins records all the public address announcements from her home studio in Hampden, Maine and sends them via email. Hopkins was named one of the 500 most important people in history by Mental Floss Magazine in December 2015.

According to Hopkins, she has ridden the New York City Subway just once, in 1957.

As of 2016, Hopkins still records for IED from her home.

See also
Emma Clarke, the voice on a majority of the London Underground
Bernie Wagenblast, another voice on the New York City Subway, AirTrain JFK and AirTrain Newark

References

External links
NPR: The Voice That Gets You Where You Need To Go
Metro Videos: Carolyn Hopkins Woman Behind The Voice at 200 Airports

Public address announcers
Living people
New York City Subway
Year of birth missing (living people)